The 800 metres race has been on the Summer Paralympic Games program since the 1980 Summer Paralympics.

Men's medal summaries

Ambulant athletes

Amputee athletes

Blind athletes

Wheelchair athletes

Women's medal summaries

Ambulant athletes

Amputee athletes

Blind athletes

Intellectually impaired athletes

Wheelchair athletes

See also
Athletics at the Olympics
800 metres at the Olympics

References

Athletics at the Summer Paralympics
Paralympic medalists in athletics (track and field)